Rotherfield Park is a country house and estate located in East Tisted, East Hampshire in England. The park originated as a medieval hunting park, which may have been predated by a settlement and was later in the 18th century turned into pleasure grounds. The land owned by the park stretches across much of East Hampshire and includes fields in Colemore, Priors Dean, East Tisted and other parishes. In 1815–21 large changes were made to the older estate house; the designs were made by architect Joseph T. Parkinson and is a Grade I listed building.

History
Rotherfield Park is an ancient estate first mentioned in 1015 as Hrytherafeld meaning 'the open land for cattle.' There was likely settlement here predating the medieval hunting park which is first mentioned in the 16th century. The evidence for the park can still be seen today as a complex of ditches running around the estate. The estate has undergone a number of changes over the centuries, the first major one being the creation of pleasure grounds there in the 18th century, of which many features still exist. A detailed map of the estate was made at some point in the 1600s (see right), it is likely stored in the Rotherfield Park Estate Archives along with a wealth of other records which has unfortunately been kept hidden from researchers and historians.

Archaeology
Near to the park is a large amount of prehistoric activity, large flint scatters from the Neolithic were uncovered during field walking in the 1970s, also prehistoric ceramic finds  dot the area suggesting settlement. This along with other flint concetrations in nearby Chawton and Ropley suggests a potential broad area of prehistoric settlement which requires more archaeological attention from local archaeological groups.

Points of interest
The house was owned by the local MP and High Sheriff of Hampshire, James Winter Scott, in the 1860s.

It was used a filming location for House of the Long Shadows and Agatha Christie's Poirot episode "After the Funeral". Rotherfield Park was also used filming the fourth season of Grantchester for the scenes around the Manor house owned by the new vicar's parents.

See also
 Grade I listed buildings in Hampshire

References

External links 

 National Garden Scheme | Rotherfield Park

Country houses in Hampshire
Grade I listed buildings in Hampshire